Crash Lab is an independent British video game developer. The company was founded in November 2011 by Steve Ellis, Martin Wakeley and Lee Musgrave

The company develops mobile games for iOS devices (including the iPhone, iPad and iPod Touch),
Android devices (including Kindle Fire HD), PlayStation Mobile, Mac App Store, Samsung Apps and Blackberry App World

Developed titles

Twist Pilot 

Twist Pilot was initially released on iOS and Android in 2012 as part of the Zynga Partners for Mobile program and subsequently released on PlayStation Mobile, Mac App Store, Blackberry App World and Samsung Apps.

The Snowman and The Snowdog 

The Snowman and The Snowdog game were published on iOS and Android by Channel 4

The game was based on The Snowman and The Snowdog film, produced by Lupus Films.

The game reached number 1 in the iPhone and iPad game charts and was downloaded over 1 million times in the UK and Ireland.

Awards 

2013 Develop 100 - Crash Lab was listed as one of the 100 best UK game studios
2013 Broadcast Digital Awards - Winner: Best Game (The Snowman and The Snowdog)
2013 BIMA Awards - Winner: Best Tablet App (The Snowman and The Snowdog)
Yahoo News - App of the day (The Snowman and The Snowdog)
Tech Digest - App of the day (The Snowman and The Snowdog)
Eurogamer - App of the day (The Snowman and The Snowdog)
App Consumer - App of the day (The Snowman and The Snowdog)
2013 Webby Awards - Honoree: Best Game for a Handheld Device (The Snowman and The Snowdog)
2013 Develop Awards - nominated: Best Micro Studio (Crash Lab)
2013 Develop Awards - nominated: Best Use of a Licence or IP (The Snowman and The Snowdog)
2013 AOP Digital Publishing Awards - nominated: Mobile and Tablet Innovation (The Snowman and The Snowdog)

Notable staff 

Steve Ellis - previously Managing Director at Free Radical Design, and wrote the Multiplayer aspect of Goldeneye, while at Rare
Martin Wakeley - previously Designer and Producer at Rare and Free Radical Design
Lee Musgrave - previously Head of Art at Rare
Graeme Norgate - Musician at Rare and Audio Director at Free Radical Design

References

External links 
 

2011 establishments in England
Video game development companies
Companies based in Nottingham
Video game companies established in 2011
Video game companies of the United Kingdom
Free Radical Design